Videcom International Limited is a United Kingdom travel technology company based in Henley-on-Thames. It designs, develops and provides modern computer reservations systems to airlines and the travel industry, specializing in the hosting and distribution of airline sales.

The system is connected to the Global Distribution Systems of Sabre, Amadeus, Galileo, Worldspan and Abacus, which travel agents use to make airline bookings, and is also connected to other airline systems for interline bookings. The IATA airline designator for Videcom is U1.

History
Founded in 1972, the company originally manufactured computer terminals for uses throughout the aviation and travel sectors, including airline reservation centers, airport operations and travel agency systems. Over 450,000 computer terminals were manufactured between 1972 and 2002 and refurbishments are still supported today, with many units still in use globally at airlines and airports. The company diversified into airline software development in 1987.

In 1976, Videcom International along with British Airways, British Caledonian and CCL, launched Travicom, the world's first multi-access reservations system. It was wholly based on Videcom technology. They formed a network to thousands of travel agents in the UK providing distribution for 49 subscribing international airlines, including British Airways, British Caledonian, TWA, Pan American World Airways, Qantas, Singapore Airlines, Air France, Lufthansa, SAS, Air Canada, KLM, Alitalia, Cathay Pacific, JAL) and some African airlines. It allowed agents and airlines to communicate via a common distribution language and network, handling 97% of UK airline business trade bookings by 1987.

The system went on to be replicated by Videcom in other areas of the world including the Middle East (DMARS), New Zealand, Kuwait (KMARS), Ireland, Caribbean, United States and Hong Kong. The Travicom multi access system was eventually replaced by Galileo in the UK and in 1988, Travel Automations Services Ltd (trading as Travicom) changed its trading name to Galileo UK and agents using Travicom were migrated to Galileo.

Since the late 1980s to the current day, Videcom has continued to develop products mostly related to airlines and airports, including terminal emulator software, airport check-in systems, Common Use Terminal Equipment (CUTE), Aircraft Weight and Balance systems, Unit Load Device management, and a modern Airline Reservations System, including an integrated Departure Control System.

In 2004, Videcom sold some of their standalone products, such as standalone DCS, Weight and Balance and the Common Use System, to Ultra Electronics.

The new product suite, which the company has provided to approximately 35 airlines since 2001, includes VRS, the Airline Reservations Systems and an integrated Departure Control System used by regional and international airlines.

Products used by airlines today
Inventory Hosting
Airline Hosting Platform
Fare Distribution
Flight Scheduling
GDS Distribution (Type A & Type B)
IATA PNR's
XML distribution

Internet Booking Engine
Ancillary Sales
Credit Card/Debit card transactions
Customer profiling
Low Fare Finder Calendar
Online Check-in
Seat Selection

Ticketing
IATA Electronic Ticketing
Paper Tickets
Ticketless Travel

Global Distribution Systems
Connected to:
Amadeus
Galileo
Sabre
Worldspan

Interline Sales
Connected to other airlines
IATA IET (Interline Eticket)

Reporting
HTML, XML, CSV formats
Management Information System
Revenue Accounting*Revenue/Yield Management
Sales Reports
Ticketing data

References

External links 
 Videcom.com homepage

Software companies of the United Kingdom
Information technology companies of the United Kingdom
Software companies established in 1972
Travel technology
Computer reservation systems